Argyresthia brockeella is a moth of the family Yponomeutidae. It is found in Europe, east Siberia and Japan. The wingspan is 9–12 mm. The head and thorax are white. Forewings are deep coppery-golden; a spot on base of dorsum, a fascia at 1/3, three posterior semioval costal spots and a larger tornal spot shining white; sometimes the fascia is connected with adjacent costal and dorsal spots. Hindwings are grey. The larva is pinkish-brown; head brown; plate of 2 partly blackish-edged.

The moth flies from May to September. . The larvae feed on the catkins of birch (Betula spp) and alder (Alnus glutinosa).

References

Notes
The flight season refers to Belgium and The Netherlands. This may vary in other parts of the range.

External links
 
 waarneming.nl 
 Lepidoptera of Belgium
 Argyresthia brockeella at UK Moths

Argyresthia
Moths described in 1813
Moths of Asia
Moths of Europe
Taxa named by Jacob Hübner